2013 Regional League Division 2 Northern Region is the fifth season of the League competition since its establishment in 2009. It is in the third tier of the Thai football league system.

Changes from last season

Team changes

Promoted clubs

No club was promoted to the Thai Division 1 League. Last years league champions Chiangmai, runners up Phitsanulok failed to qualify from the 2012 Regional League Division 2 championship pool.

Relocated clubs

Paknampho NSRU have all been moved into the Bangkok Area Division 2013Singburi have all been moved into the Central-West Region 2013

Stadium and locations

Personnel and sponsoring
Note: Flags indicate national team as has been defined under FIFA eligibility rules. Players may hold more than one non-FIFA nationality.

League table

References

External links
 Football Association of Thailand

Regional League Northern Division seasons
Nor